When Innocence Is Lost is a 1997 American drama television film directed by Bethany Rooney and written by Deborah Jones. The music of the film was composed by Dennis McCarthy. It stars Keri Russell, Jill Clayburgh, Vince Corazza, Julie Khaner, and Charlotte Sullivan.

Plot

When Erica French (Keri Russell) opts to keep the baby she conceived in high school, she never dreamed that one day she would be fighting for custody against the child's father, Scott Stone (Vince Corazza). Scott Stone initially fought for custody when Erica threatened to cut off his access to their daughter. Scott continues to try to be a part of his daughter's life, but when Molly first breaks her arm at the playground then Scott's mother finds mysterious bruises on her granddaughter, Scott again fights for custody of young Molly, and this time he wins because the court feels his family can provide a more stable environment for Molly than a public daycare can.

Cast
 Keri Russell as Erica French
 Jill Clayburgh as Susan French
 Vince Corazza as Scott Stone
 Julie Khaner as Erica's Lawyer
 Charlotte Sullivan as Annie French
 Roberta Maxwell as Cynthia Adams
 Barry Flatman as David Trask
 Nicole de Boer as Nancy
 Neil Dainard as Judge Carter
 John Neville as Mr Laurence
 Mary Wickes as Aunt March
 Deborah Grover as Barbara Stone

External links
 

1997 films
1997 television films
1997 drama films
1990s English-language films
Teenage pregnancy in film
Teenage pregnancy in television
Films scored by Dennis McCarthy
American drama television films
Films directed by Bethany Rooney
1990s American films